Bodily Harm is a novel by Margaret Atwood. It was first published by McClelland and Stewart in 1981.

Plot introduction
The novel's protagonist Rennie Wilford is a travel reporter.  After surviving breast cancer, she travels to the fictional Caribbean island St. Antoine to carry out research for an article.  The island, however, is on the brink of revolution. Rennie tries to stay away from politics, but is drawn into events through her romance with Paul, a key player in the uprising, and ends up in a survival struggle.

Themes
A major theme of Bodily Harm is power.

As in many of the heroines of Atwood's novels, Rennie is addicted to negative relationships.  She feels "hooked like a junkie" to her relationship with Jake, and becomes unable to distinguish between sadomasochism and genuine aggression.

References

External links
Atwood discusses Bodily Harm with Fay Weldon - a British Library sound recording

1981 Canadian novels
Novels by Margaret Atwood
Novels set in the Caribbean
McClelland & Stewart books